Al Bennay, is a village located in Mount Lebanon, Aley District, Mount Lebanon Governorate, Lebanon. It is located approximately 30 km from Beirut at an altitude between 750 and 800m, and has an area of 3 km². Al Bennay is bordered by Damour River to the south/east, Kfarmatta to the west, Kabreshmoun to the north and Aabey to the west. It overlooks the Damour River and Bshatfeen, which can be seen from any point in the village.

Al Bennay has relatively warm summers. In winter, there are occasional snow falls, which may remain on the ground for a couple of days. Temperature in winter ranges from 12 °C to occasionally below freezing.

The main families in Al Bennay are Yehya, Wehbe, Jaber, Hassan, Shamseldeen, Nasr, Daou and Hamdan. Many families immigrated to South America in the early 1920s, most notably to Argentina, Brazil, and Venezuela, and whose members were appointed ambassadors to Lebanon.

In 2006, the Druze community in Lebanon elected Al Bennay's Sheikh Naim Hassan as its spiritual leader. In his role, Sheikh Hassan represents the highest Druze religious authority, and he conveys the opinions and laws by which Druze religious affairs are handled.

References 

Binnay, Lebanese Resource center for local development. 
:ar:%D9%86%D8%B9%D9%8A%D9%85 %D8%AD%D8%B3%D9%86, Sheikh Naim Hassan's Arabic Wikipedia page
:ar:%D9%85%D8%B4%D9%8A%D8%AE%D8%A9 %D8%B9%D9%82%D9%84 %D8%A7%D9%84%D9%85%D9%88%D8%AD%D8%AF%D9%8A%D9%86 %D8%A7%D9%84%D8%AF%D8%B1%D9%88%D8%B2 %D9%81%D9%8A %D9%84%D8%A8%D9%86%D8%A7%D9%86, The Druze religious authority in Lebanon, Arabic Wikipedia page

External links
Binnay, localiban

Populated places in Aley District